South Pine Sports Complex is a sport and leisure centre in Brendale, a suburb of Brisbane, Queensland, Australia.

It was the primary home ground for the Brisbane Lions in the AFL Women's competition during the 2017 and 2018 seasons. On 18 February 2017, it hosted its first AFL Women's game, between Brisbane and Collingwood. No games were fixtured at the venue for the 2019 season, with most being moved to Moreton Bay Central Sports Complex. It has also served as a home ground for the club's reserves team in the NEAFL and VFL. The South Pine Sports Complex has also hosted the Queensland Murri Carnival.

References

Brisbane Lions
North East Australian Football League grounds
AFL Women's grounds
Sports venues completed in 2016
2016 establishments in Australia
Multi-purpose stadiums in Australia
Sports venues in Brisbane
Sports complexes in Australia